Hildegund (died 1188) was a German woman who lived under the name Joseph disguised as a male in a monastery. She is often described as a saint (feast day April 20), though her cult has never been formally approved.

Her father, a knight of Neuss in Germany, took the 12-year-old Hildegund on a pilgrimage to the Holy Land upon her mother's death. For her protection during the voyage, he dressed her as a boy and called her Joseph. The father died on the way back, and Hildegund was robbed and abandoned in Tyre by the man charged with her protection. Still dressed as a boy, she managed to return to Germany, where she became servant to an old canon of Cologne. The two began a voyage to visit the pope, who lived in Verona at the time. Accused of being a robber and condemned to death, Hildegund was saved by undergoing the ordeal of red hot iron, only to be hanged by the true robbers' companions. She was cut down in time and survived. After having returned to Germany, she joined Schönau Abbey as a Cistercian novice. She attempted to run away two or three times and never took the vows.

She had described her adventures (though not her cross-dressing) to the monk charged with her instruction. Her true sex was discovered upon her death. An abbot of a nearby monastery wrote an account of her life in 1188, the year of her death.

Hildegund should not be confused with Saint Hildegund (c. 1130–1178), whose feast day is 6 February.

References

1188 deaths
Female-to-male cross-dressers
12th-century German women
Year of birth unknown
12th-century monks